Derrick Kelly II (born August 23, 1995) is an American football offensive guard for the San Antonio Brahmas of the XFL. He played college football at Florida State.

College career
Kelly was a member of the Florida State Seminoles for five seasons, redshirting as a true freshman. He played in 34 games with 28 starts over the course of his collegiate career.

Professional career

New Orleans Saints
Kelly was signed by the New Orleans Saints as an undrafted free agent following the 2019 NFL Draft on April 27, 2019. He was waived on August 30, 2019, during final roster cuts and was re-signed to the team's practice squad the following day. Kelly signed a reserve/futures contract on January 6, 2020, and made the Saints' active roster coming out of training camp the next season. Kelly made his NFL debut on September 13, 2020, in the season opener against the Tampa Bay Buccaneers. He was placed on the reserve/COVID-19 list by the team on November 29, 2020, and activated on December 9.

On August 31, 2021, Kelly was waived by the Saints and re-signed to the practice squad. He was released on October 12.

New York Giants
On October 19, 2021, Kelly was signed to the New York Giants practice squad. His contract expired when the teams season ended on January 9, 2022.

New York Jets
On May 9, 2022, Kelly signed with the New York Jets. He was released on August 16, 2022.

New Orleans Saints (second stint)
On August 17, 2022, Kelly was claimed off waivers by the New Orleans Saints. He was waived on August 28. He was re-signed to the practice squad on November 10, 2022.

San Antonio Brahmas
Kelly was placed on the reserve list by the San Antonio Brahmas of the XFL on March 7, 2023.

References

External links
Florida State Seminoles bio
New Orleans Saints bio

1995 births
Living people
American football offensive tackles
Florida State Seminoles football players
New Orleans Saints players
Players of American football from Florida
African-American players of American football
21st-century African-American sportspeople
New York Giants players
New York Jets players
San Antonio Brahmas players